The Warangal train crash was an accident which occurred on 2 July 2003 in the city of Warangal, Telangana, in India.

The Golconda Express passenger service from Guntur to Secunderabad was scheduled to stop at Warangal station in mid-morning, but the driver failed to halt the train. He has subsequently claimed that the brakes stopped working long before the service arrived at Warangal, and that his train was supposed to have been put onto a loop line around the station until the problem was fixed. This was done but due to the speed it jumped over the loop line and onto the road below the bridge situated just after the station as the driver lost control causing the engine and two carriages to break through a concrete barrier and fall into the crowded street below, crushing several cars, market stalls and rickshaws beneath it.

The eventual death toll was 22 killed with more than 110 injured, some very seriously. 13 of the dead had been train passengers, the others people who had been in the streets below. Rescue work was severely hampered by the congested nature of the streets as well as heavy rainfall. Local people were able to pull many of the lightly wounded to safety before the emergency services finally arrived. The families of the dead were paid 100,000 rupees, more than is usual in Indian railway accidents.

The problem was believed to be the result of faulty brakes and poor communication between the train and the officials at Warangal station, neither of whom understood the full situation. The heavy rains compounded the problem, by reducing the friction of the rails and making it easier for the driver to lose control.

External links
BBC News Report
Indian News Report

2003 disasters in India
Railway accidents and incidents in Telangana
Railway accidents in 2003
Warangal
2003 in India
History of Andhra Pradesh (1947–2014)
Railway accidents and incidents in Andhra Pradesh
Bridge disasters in India
Bridge disasters caused by maintenance error
Bridge disasters caused by collision
Derailments in India
July 2003 events in India
Transport in Warangal